Maquon is a village in Knox County, Illinois, United States. The population was 218 at the 2020 census. It is part of the Galesburg Micropolitan Statistical Area.

Geography
Maquon is located in southern Knox County at  (40.798290, -90.162832). Illinois Route 97 passes through the center of the village, leading northwest  to Galesburg, the county seat, and southeast  to Illinois Route 8.

Demographics

At the 2010 census there were 284 people, 139 households, and 82 families in the village. The racial makeup of the village was 98.43% White, 0.63% Asian, 0.31% from other races, and 0.63% from two or more races. Hispanic or Latino of any race were 3.14%.

Of the 139 households 33.1% had children under the age of 18 living with them, 42.4% were married couples living together, 9.4% had a female householder with no husband present, and 40.3% were non-families. 38.1% of households were one person and 19.4% were one person aged 65 or older. The average household size was 2.29 and the average family size was 2.93.

The age distribution was 26.4% under the age of 18, 6.0% from 18 to 24, 27.4% from 25 to 44, 23.3% from 45 to 64, and 17.0% 65 or older. The median age was 37 years. For every 100 females, there were 78.7 males. For every 100 females age 18 and over, there were 80.0 males.

The median household income was $32,917 and the median family income  was $36,563. Males had a median income of $29,375 versus $22,000 for females. The per capita income for the village was $15,199. About 5.1% of families and 10.3% of the population were below the poverty line, including 11.8% of those under age 18 and 11.1% of those age 65 or over.

References

External links
 Official website

Villages in Knox County, Illinois
Villages in Illinois
Galesburg, Illinois micropolitan area